Khuwar or Khuvar may be:

 an alternative spelling of Khowar, a language of Pakistan
 medieval city in Qumis, probably related to the ancient town Choara, Media

See also 
 Khovar
 Khwar (disambiguation)
 Khavar (disambiguation)